This is a list of the current members of the Greenlandic Parliament (Inatsisartut), as of 11 January 2018.

List

References

Lists of members of the parliament of Greenland
Parliament